Halmășd is a commune located in Sălaj County, Crișana, Romania. It is composed of five villages: Aleuș (Elyüs), Cerișa (Szilágycseres), Drighiu (Detrehem), Fufez (Tufertelep) and Halmășd.

References

Communes in Sălaj County
Localities in Crișana